Nickerie is a district of Suriname, on the north-west coast. Nickerie's capital city is Nieuw-Nickerie. Another town is Wageningen. The district borders the Atlantic Ocean to the north, the Surinamese district of Coronie to the east, the Surinamese district of Sipaliwini to the south and the region of East Berbice-Corentyne in Guyana to the west.

Nickerie has a population of 36.639 (2004) and an area of 5,353 km2. Nickerie's population includes East Indian, Javanese, Afro-Surinamese, Chinese, and Europeans.

Nickerie is bordered with Guyana. There is no bridge between the countries, but there is a ferry that sails between Molson Creek in Guyana and South Drain.

History
Nickerie District was originally settled by Amerindians. Near the Wonotobo Falls, a settlement was discovered which dates from the 1st century BC. Between the 6th and 16th century some terpen (artificial mounts) were built in the coastal area of which Hertenrits is the best known. In 1613, a tobacco plantation was established on the Courantyne River, however it disappeared without a trace.

In 1718, Dietzel became the first person to successfully settle in the area. In 1797, governor Jurriaan François de Friderici approved the first plantation in Nickerie. A large number of Scottish and English settlers arrived in the area during the British Occupation, and primarily grew cotton and coffee. The capital Nieuw Nickerie was built in 1879 after the former center of the district, Nieuw Rotterdam, was destroyed by floods.

The name Nickerie is probably based on Neekeari which was first reported by Teenstra in 1596 for an indigenous tribe living the area. The name also appears in Robert Dudley's The Voyage of Robert Dudley to the West-Indies, 1594-1595.

Nickerie had a poor connection to Paramaribo. It was not until 1960s when the East-West Link was constructed linking Nickerie with the rest of the country.

Resorts

 Groot Henar
 Nieuw Nickerie
 Oostelijke Polders
 Wageningen
 Westelijke Polders

Villages
 Cupido
 Glasgow
 Hamptoncourtpolder
 Lokono Shikuabana
 Manchester
 Paradise
 South Drain

Agriculture

During the 19th century, Nickerie became home to many plantation. The abolition of slavery, transformed the area in smaller scale farming. In the late 19 century, many plantations start to  shift to balatá production whose latex was used for driving belts and isolation, but started to become obsolete in the early 20th century. In 1955, a project of poldering started, resulting in an increase of cultivatable land.

Bananas and rice are the main crops grown in Nickerie. Some rice had been grown previously, but during the 20th century, Nickerie became the centre of the rice in Suriname, mainly due to the East Indian and Javanese indentured laborers.

Tourism
Nieuw Nickerie is started to develop as a tourist area. There are quite a number of hotels in the city, and the nearby Bigi Pan Nature Reserve opened opportunities for ecotourism. In 1972, the Hertenrits Nature Reserve was founded. In the reserve there are five terpen (artificial mounts). They were located in the middle of the swamp, and remains from the pre-Columbian era had been discovered in the mounts. Hertenrits has been incorporated into the Bigi Pan reserve.

References

External links
 Nickerie.nl
 Nickerie.net
 
 

 
Districts of Suriname